Oldsworth is a surname. Notable people with the surname include:

Arnold Oldsworth (born 1561), English politician and lawyer
Richard Oldsworth (1590–1649), English academic theologian
William Oldsworth (died 1603), English politician